Dolores Sutton (born Dolores Lila Silverstein, February 4, 1927 – May 11, 2009) was an American actress, writer and playwright. Her career spanned seven decades and encompassed television, stage and movie roles.

Early years
Born in New York City to Benjamin and Mary Silverstein, Sutton graduated from New York University in 1948 with a B.A. in philosophy.

Career 
In 1960, playwright Sophie Treadwell selected Sutton for the female lead in a revival of her play, Machinal after having seen the actress perform on television.

While working on her master's degree, Sutton wrote a radio script (Siblings), sold it to NBC, and landed the voice role. This started her career as an actress and writer. 

As an actress, Sutton worked in experimental theater and was a star with the National Repertory Company. Her Broadway credits included Rhinoceros (1961), General Seeger (1962), and My Fair Lady (1993).

Sutton's work as a playwright included adapting Thomas Wolfe's The Web and the Rock for the stage. Critic John Simon's review of a production of the play in New York magazine included the comment, "Most of the novel's sweep, it's period panorama, was gone; what was left was the churning, puerile poeticism." Sutton also had the lead in the play, leading another reviewer to write, "She is far better as an actress than as a writer."

Death 
Sutton died of cancer on May 11, 2009, at the Actor's Home in Englewood, New Jersey, aged 82.

Acting credits

Stage
Sutton played lead roles in three Broadway plays.
1960: Rhinoceros as Daisy
1961: General Seeger as The Woman
1994: My Fair Lady as Mrs. Higgins

Her Off-Broadway credits include leading roles in the following plays:
1956: The Man with the Golden Arm as Molly
1958: Career as Barbara Neilson
1960: Machinal as Helen Jones when she won the Vernon Rice Citation
1963: Brecht on Brecht
1969: To Be Young Gifted and Black in various roles
1972: The Web and the Rock as Esther (also the playwright)
1973: The Seagull as Irina Arkadina
1990: What's Wrong with This Picture as Bella

Film
1958: The Mugger
1963: Nine Miles to Noon as Julia Dimou
1966: The Trouble with Angels as Sister Rose Marie
1968: Where Angels Go, Trouble Follows as Sister Rose Marie
1986: Dream Lover (voice)
1988: Crossing Delancey as Aunt Miriam
1989: Crimes and Misdemeanors as Judah's Secretary
1990: Tales from the Darkside: The Movie as Amanda (segment "Cat From Hell")

References

External links

Dolores Sutton papers, 1945-1996 and undated, held by the Billy Rose Theatre Division, New York Public Library for the Performing Arts
LLA archive

1927 births
2009 deaths
American film actresses
American soap opera actresses
American stage actresses
American television actresses
Deaths from cancer in New Jersey
New York University alumni
Actresses from New York City
20th-century American actresses
21st-century American women